Sleeping Fist is a 1979 Hong Kong martial arts film directed by Teddy Yip and starring Bryan Leung and Yuen Siu-tien.

Plot
Plainclothes policeman Kam Tai-fat (Bryan Leung) discovers the crimes committed by Cho Tin-pa (Eddy Ko) and plans to report it to the capitol. When Cho discovers this, he sends a group of thugs to hunt Kam down. One day, Kam was severely beaten by Kam's thug and there, he meets Kid (Wong Yat-lung), a street urchin who rescues him and takes him to his master Old Fox (Yuen Siu-tien).

One day, Kid was injured in a fight with local bullies. Seeing this, Fox decides to teach Kam and Kid the martial arts style of Sleeping Fist. Fox, Kam and Kid then sets foot to Shang Wei martial arts school to teach a lesson to the bullies who injured Kid earlier. The trio easily defeat them. Feeling humiliated, Shang Wei school hires Cho, a master of Eagle Claw, to seek revenge.

Cast
Bryan Leung as Kam Tai-fat
Yuen Siu-tien as Old Fox
Wong Yat-lung as Kid
Suen Lam
Au-yeung Ling-lung as The girl
Ma Chin-ku
Eddy Ko as Cho Tai-pa
Weng Hsiao-hu
Ching Kuo-chung
Au Lap-po as Waiter
Shih Ting-ken
Chik Ngai-hung
Siu Tak-fu
Law Hon
Chow Kam-kong as Student
Chu Ko as Rascal

Reception

Critical
Eion Friel of The Action Elite rated the film three out of five stars and gave a mixed review. He ultimately concluded the review and writes "Overall, Sleeping Fist is a hugely entertaining kung fu movie, let down by some awful dubbing which causes more unintentional laughter than anything else." J. Doyle Wallis of DVD Talk also rated the film three out of five stars and writes "Sleeping Fist is still so well paced and infused with enough character that I really didn't mind the cute stuff as much as I usually would (some cute moments to look out for, Old Fox steering the Kid around like a puppet fighting a group of thugs- the kid when finally liking Old Fox, dresses exactly like him- some urination humor)." Andrew Saroch of Far East Films rated the film the same score as well and gave a mixed review criticizing its predictable story with no plot twist and also praising the action scenes and lead actor Bryan Leung's performance.

Box office
The film grossed HK$1,204,494.50 at the Hong Kong box office during its theatrical from 24 May to 1 June 1979 in Hong Kong.

References

External links

Sleeping Fist at Hong Kong Cinemagic

1979 films
1979 martial arts films
1970s action films
1970s martial arts films
Hong Kong action comedy films
Hong Kong martial arts comedy films
Kung fu films
Wushu films
1970s Cantonese-language films
1970s Hong Kong films